Lippa is a village in the Kinnaur district of Himachal Pradesh, India.

References 

Villages in Kinnaur district